Luis Tomas Sosa Sierra (born ) is a Cuban male volleyball player. He is part of the Cuba men's national volleyball team. On club level he plays for La Habana. He didn't play in Rio Olympics in 2016 for being one of the six players of the Cuban national volleyball team that were remanded into custody suspected of committing aggravated rape in July 2016 in Tampere, Finland. In September 2016 he was sentenced to three years and six months in jail. The Turku Court of Appeal overturned the decision in June 2017 due to lack of compelling evidence in his case, leading to Sosa Sierra's release.

References

External links
 profile at FIVB.org

1995 births
Living people
Cuban men's volleyball players
Place of birth missing (living people)
Expatriates in Finland